James Gordon is a Canadian singer-songwriter, known as a founding member of Tamarack. He has also released more than 20 solo albums.

Musical career 

As a prolific songwriter, James Gordon is known for such diverse songs as "Sweaters for Penguins" and "Frobisher Bay".
He wrote the weekly song for the CBC Radio program Basic Black. He is proficient on a variety of instruments including guitar, piano, banjo and mandola.
His songs have been covered by other musical artists such as the Cowboy Junkies ("Mining for Gold") and Melanie Doane.

He has toured internationally in North America, the British Isles, Southeast Asia, and Cuba.

He is a co-founder of Guelph's annual Hillside Festival and was its first creative director, from 1985 to 1988. He also founded (and was the artistic director of) the Canadian Songwriters' Festival, and was a board member of the Ontario Council of Folk Festivals. Gordon is active in arts-, civics-, and environment-related causes in the Guelph region, for which he was given the Guelph Mayor's Award in 2008.

Politics

Provincial 
He was the candidate for the Ontario New Democratic Party in the riding of Guelph in the 2011 Ontario provincial election but lost to incumbent Liz Sandals. He ran again in 2014 but once again lost to Liz Sandals.

Municipal 
James Gordon declared his candidacy for Ward Two City Councillor in the city of Guelph, Ontario in the 27 October 2014 Guelph municipal election. Gordon was elected to serve alongside Andy Van Hellemond and plans to continue his activist pursuits such as touring his one-man show, "Stephen Harper: The Musical". Gordon was re-elected in 2018 Ontario municipal elections. Gordon announced his retirement from municipal politics in June 2022.

Discography

Tamarack 

 Au Canada (1980)
 Wind River
 Spirit & Stone
 13
 Fields of Rock and Snow (1993)
 Frobisher Bay (1993)
 Leaving Inverarden (1995)
 Blankets of Snow (1998)

Solo recordings
 Looking for Livingstone (1987)
 Farther Along (1991)
 Hometown Tunes (1994)
 Dim Lights, Small City (1995)
 More Hometown Tunes (1997)
 Pipe Street Dreams (1999)
 Mining for Gold: Twenty Years of Songwriting (2002)
 Tune Cooties (2002)
 One Timeless Moment (2003)
 Endomusia (2004), includes "Weapons of Mass Instruction"
 Nine Green Bottles (2007), includes "Casey Sheehan Didn't Die for Nothing", credited to James Gordon and Sons
 My Stars Your Eyes (2009)
 Coyote's Calling   (2013), includes "Jack's Dream"
  “Sunny Jim” (2016) includes “This Canoe Runs on Water” &  “I’m        Just A Farmhouse” (SOCAN).

Folk operas (musicals)

James Gordon used to perform with David Archibald as "Jane & Dave", producing family-oriented musicals.
 Jane & Dave's Awesome Environmental Adventure (1990)
 Jane & Dave's Awesome Search for the Golden Toad (1992)
 Jane & Dave's Awesome Supernatural Camping Adventure (1993)

More recently, his work includes:
 Hardscrabble Road (2003)
 Two Steps and a Glass of Water (2005), which deals with mental illness and health, also a film by Glenn Curtis 
 Tryst and Snout (2007)
 Stephen Harper: The Musical (2013)

Cinema
  "Mining for Gold" on the soundtrack of the film Silver City (2004)
 Two Steps and a Glass of Water

Electoral record

References

1955 births
Living people
Canadian male singer-songwriters
Canadian folk singer-songwriters
Canadian anti–Iraq War activists
Canadian anti-war activists
Ontario New Democratic Party candidates in Ontario provincial elections
Guelph city councillors
Musicians from Guelph